Patrick Jackson (born 8 April 1984) is an Australian cricketer. He played one first-class and one List A match for New South Wales in 2014/15.

See also
 List of New South Wales representative cricketers

References

External links
 

1984 births
Living people
Australian cricketers
New South Wales cricketers
Place of birth missing (living people)